Serebryanka is a rural locality (a selo) in Zemlyanskoye Rural Settlement, Semiluksky District, Voronezh Oblast, Russia. The population was 573 as of 2010. There are 5 streets.

Geography 
Serebryanka is located 34 km northwest of Semiluki (the district's administrative centre) by road. Zemlyansk is the nearest rural locality.

References 

Rural localities in Semiluksky District